Visitors to the Gambia must obtain a visa from one of the Gambian diplomatic missions unless they come from one of the visa exempt countries.

In October 2019, the Government of the Gambia announced plans for a new visa policy.

Visa policy map

Visa exemption 
In October 2019, the Gambian Ministry of Foreign Affairs published its visa policy.

The detailed stay date was not disclosed, but according to travel information from Germany or UK, it is estimated to be 28 days.

 citizens can enter the country with a visa on arrival. (30 days)

(Travelers entering and exiting The Gambia are required to pay a $20 (or 20 euros, or 10000 dalasi) security fee upon arrival and departure at the airport, payable in cash (USD or dalasi) only at kiosks.)

Visitor statistics
Most visitors arriving to the Gambia for tourism purposes were from the following countries of nationality:

See also

Visa requirements for Gambian citizens
Gambian passport

References 

Gambia
Foreign relations of the Gambia